Notre Dame High School, Belmont is a private, All-Female, Catholic, college preparatory high school located in the San Mateo County suburb of Belmont, California.

The school is operated by the Sisters of Notre Dame de Namur for the Archdiocese of San Francisco. The school's mission is driven by the teachings of Saint Julie Billiart, the foundress of the Sisters of Notre Dame de Namur. The official school colors are navy, blue, and gold.

History
The School was founded in 1851 originally in San Jose, California. In 1923 they moved to the current Belmont campus on the land of William Ralston's estate, Ralston Hall. The current building was completed in 1928. The school was also originally a boarding school and had facilities to support boarders and day students.

Programs

Student council
Each class has 7 officers and homeroom presidents for each homeroom. The 7 offices are: president, vice president, secretary/treasurer, historian, athletics, activities, and spirit.

There are six student body officers, called the Associated Student Body (ASB), who work with the director of student activities in coordinating the programs listed. Student Council meetings are held twice a month. Student body officers run the meetings. All class officers and advisory presidents are asked to attend, but any student may attend a student council meeting. Student Council members also attend three leadership conferences/retreats per year.

Leadership opportunities
According to their website, Notre Dame offers approximately 213 leadership positions. Positions include Ambassadors, Spiritual Life, California Scholarship Federation, National Honor Society, Technology Liaisons, Marketing & Communications, Link Crew, Health & Wellness. There are also opportunities for students as club leaders.

School mascot
Two students share the position of "NDB Tiger." They make appearances at school, athletic, and community events. The official school colors are navy, blue, and gold. Each class also chooses a class mascot during their freshman year.

Clubs
There are over 35 clubs at Notre Dame. A member of the faculty or staff moderates each club.

Performing arts
In July 2008, a combined choir represented Notre Dame at World Youth Day 2008 in Sydney, Australia. The choir sang for over 300,000 people prior to a mass presided by Pope Benedict XVI. In addition, the Notre Dame choir program has received special recognition including many first-place trophies at various competitions, and a proclamation made by the Belmont City Council in late 2008. However, Notre Dame’s choir program was discontinued after the 2020-2021 school year.

Notre Dame is also part of Tri-School Productions, a three-school theatre company with Serra High School and Mercy High School Burlingame. They perform a play in the fall and a musical in the spring. There is a Tri-School Mixed Chorus that performs at the school concerts for all three schools, plus a special performance at Hillsdale Mall.

Academic Teams
Currently Notre Dame has two academic teams, Mock Trial and a FIRST Tech Challenge robotics team called the TigerBots.

Athletics
According to the NDB website, there are 14 sports programs that include 26 teams over the fall, winter and spring seasons.

Rallies and assemblies
Spirit rallies are held several times during the school year to honor sports teams or simply to celebrate school spirit! Rallies take place in the NDB gym. Awareness-raising assemblies are also held. Past topics include mental health, abstinence, and indigenous history. These assemblies are held for the entire school as well as for smaller groups of students.

Dances
Dances are held on four Friday evenings during the school year. Each dance has a theme, which is chosen by student council. All NDB students are invited to buy tickets for the dance on a first-come, first-served basis. All dances are chaperoned by a crew of faculty and parents.

Spirit points
Spirit points are awarded to classes that have the most involvement in a particular activity (Aquacades, food drive, fundraisers, etc.). At the end of the year, the class with the most spirit points is awarded the spirit trophy. Part of spirit points is the Sister Trifecta, a competition between the Senior and Sophomore classes vs. the Freshman and Junior classes. At the end of the year, the Sister Tri-fecta trophy is awarded to the sister classes who had the best teamwork and participation in the following spirit competitions: Powder Puff Football, Penny Wars, and Aquacades.

Notable alumni

Angela Batinovich, American businesswoman and entrepreneur
Olivia de Havilland, actress
Abigail Kinoiki Kekaulike Kawānanakoa, Hawaiian princess
Yasmine Pahlavi, wife of Reza Pahlavi, Crown Prince of Iran
Faith Rivera, singer
Emma Chamberlain, American YouTuber and podcaster

See also
San Mateo County high schools
Archdiocese of San Francisco

References

External links
 Notre Dame High School website

Educational institutions established in 1851
Girls' schools in California
High schools in San Mateo County, California
Roman Catholic Archdiocese of San Francisco
Catholic secondary schools in California
Sisters of Notre Dame de Namur schools
1851 establishments in California